Proprioseiopsis beatus is a species of mite in the family Phytoseiidae.

References

beatus
Articles created by Qbugbot
Animals described in 1968